Khaled Abu Toameh (born 1963) is an Israeli Arab journalist, lecturer and documentary filmmaker.

Abu Toameh writes for The Jerusalem Post and for the New York-based Gatestone Institute, where he is a senior distinguished fellow. He is a producer and consultant for NBC News since 1989. His articles have also appeared in numerous newspapers around the world.

Biography
Khaled Abu Toameh was born to an Israeli Arab father and a Palestinian Arab mother. He grew up in the Arab-Israeli town Baqa al-Gharbiyye. He received a B.A. in English literature from the Hebrew University and lives in Jerusalem.

Media career

Since 2002, Khaled Abu Toameh has reported for The Jerusalem Post on Arab affairs. Since 1989 he has been a producer and consultant for NBC News. He has produced several documentaries on the Palestinians for the BBC, Channel 4, Australian, Danish and Swedish television.

Abu Toameh has served as a lecturer with the University of Minnesota – School of Journalism and Mass Communication. He has also lectured at the London School of Oriental and African Studies (SOAS), as well as the London-based think tank Chatham House.

Abu Toameh has spoken at the House of Commons of the United Kingdom by invitation. He was a keynote speaker at the 2009 annual conference of the Canadian Association of Journalists in Vancouver, British Columbia, Canada. He has spoken on the situation in the West Bank and Gaza Strip and prospects for peace in the Middle East at university campuses throughout the U.S. and Canada. A series of his talks have been sponsored by StandWithUs, and he spoke at their annual conference in Los Angeles in 2008.

In August 2011 Abu Toameh was invited to speak at the Sydney Institute in Australia on the challenge of Palestinian state-building. Two days later he also gave a talk on "Human rights challenges in the Palestinian territories" at a seminar organized by The Australian Human Rights Centre.

Views and opinions
Abu Toameh says he is routinely subject to condemnations, and is often threatened. He notes, however, that more threats are coming from outside the Middle East than from within the Palestinian Authority, and that those who threaten him "roundly acknowledge" that he is telling the truth and don't question his reporting, but want him to "shut up."

Abu Toameh believes that American students who say that they are against Israel's occupation are actually more interested in ending Israel than in ending Israel's occupation.

Facebook account incident
Following publication of his 2013 article "The Palestinian Authority's Inconvenient Truth", which is critical of the Palestinian Authority, the author's Facebook page was temporarily deactivated. It is unclear whether Facebook's action was taken in light of official complaints from the Palestinian Authority and Jordan or because other users flagged the posts as offensive.

Facebook reactivated his account but removed his article about the Palestinian Authority's corruption. Subsequently, Facebook issued an apology for the deletion of his article, calling it "an employee's error". In response, Abu Toameh wrote in an op-ed that many journalists in the Middle East are forced to use Facebook to publish work that their own media will not accept. He also said, "It is the duty of Facebook and Western societies to side with those seeking freedom, and not to be complicit in suppressing their voices". In the same article, he decried the recent arrests of journalists and bloggers that were critical of the Palestinian Authority's leadership in their Facebook pages.

Recognition and awards

Abu Toameh received the 2014 Daniel Pearl Award.
Abu Toameh shared Israel Media Watch's 2010 award for media criticism with the satirical Israeli website Latma.

On 10 May 2011, Khaled Abu Toameh won the Hudson Institute Award for Courage in Journalism.

Canada's Toronto Sun columnist Salim Mansur praised Abu Toameh for his courage and knowledge of the politics of the Arab world.

Abu Toameh is the 2013 recipient of the Emet award given by the Committee for Accuracy in Middle East Reporting in America (CAMERA).

He was chosen on the Algemeiner Journals 2013 list of The Top 100 People Positively Influencing Jewish Life.

References

External links
 
Interview: Khaled Abu Toameh
 
 
 
 
 
 

Israeli television journalists
Israeli Arab journalists
Arab citizens of Israel
Living people
Israeli Muslims
People from Tulkarm
Hebrew University of Jerusalem alumni
The Jerusalem Post people
1963 births